Ellington Management Group is a multi-billion dollar hedge fund operation. As of June 2019, the firm was reportedly managing $8.5 billion in structured products and other credit instruments.

History
The firm was co-founded in 1994 by Mike Vranos and Laurence Penn with funding from Ziff brothers investments. By the end of 1995 the firm had become a three-fund operation with a variety of assets.

Ellington was affected by the Long-Term Capital Management debacle in 1998. For a few days in mid-October, the firm sold mortgage securities to lower its funds' leverage. The firm issued a public statement describing its borrowings to quell public fears, which was considered unusual for hedge funds at the time. It clarified that although it was meeting margin calls by unloading hundreds of millions of dollars in assets over a two-day period, losses were limited. One report suggests some of Ellington's hedge funds may have temporarily lost around 25% of their value as they liquidated $2 billion in assets after allegedly missing a margin call from UBS. However, from its December 1994 inception through April 2004, the firm delivered a composite annualized return of 15.4%, after fees.

Notable investments
Various of Ellington's funds have invested in distressed mortgage-backed securities over time. By 2004 their $3 billion in hedge fund assets included mortgage derivatives. In October 2007, as the future credit performance of residential mortgages became increasingly uncertain, one of the funds is reported to have fallen in value by 22% and to have temporarily suspended redemptions pending greater clarity around valuations. As of 2007, Ellington Management's assets included $1.2 billion in a managed account, $5.4 billion in hedge funds and private accounts, and almost $23 billion in collateralized debt obligations. In 2014 an office was opened in London, England in order to expand into the European market.

Subsidiaries
In June 2007, Ellington Financial LLC was launched. The offering primarily targeted investments in non-agency mortgage-backed securities.  The deal was underwritten by Friedman Billings Ramsey and although originally slated for a $750 million offering, evolving market conditions only allowed for a $250 million capital raise. Before the private placement, a New York Times columnist noted that a portion of the private placement might be used to purchase risky tranches from bankrupt subprime lender New Century Financial Corporation and noted the potential difficulty in valuing such instruments. In October 2010, Ellington Financial LLC went public, debuting on the NYSE. According to its public filings, Ellington Financial invests primarily in non-agency mortgage-backed securities, but also holds agency pools and other mortgage-related securities, and had a total return of 59% between its August 2007 inception and the end of 2011.

Ellington Residential Mortgage REIT, chaired and founded by Mike Vranos, went public on the NYSE after its IPO in late 2013, trading under the ticker symbol EARN.

References 

Financial services companies established in 1994
1994 establishments in the United States
Hedge fund firms of the United States
Private equity firms of the United States